Lanistes graueri is a species of large freshwater snail, an aquatic gastropod mollusk with a gill and an operculum in the family Ampullariidae, the apple snails.

It is endemic to the Democratic Republic of the Congo.

References

Freshwater snails
Ampullariidae
Invertebrates of the Democratic Republic of the Congo
Endemic fauna of the Democratic Republic of the Congo
Gastropods of Africa
Gastropods described in 1911
Taxonomy articles created by Polbot